Naeem-ur-Rehman (born 6 August 1982) is a Pakistani first-class cricketer who played for Hyderabad cricket team.

References

External links
 

1982 births
Living people
Pakistani cricketers
Hyderabad (Pakistan) cricketers
Cricketers from Mardan